Saeed Jalili (born 1 September 1965) is an Iranian conservative politician and diplomat who was secretary of the Supreme National Security Council from 2007 to 2013. He is currently member of the Expediency Discernment Council. 

He was also Iran's nuclear negotiator. He was previously deputy foreign minister for European and American Affairs. Jalili was an unsuccessful candidate in the June 2013 presidential election, placing third.

He also ran in the 2021 presidential election but resigned in favour of Seyyed Ibrahim Ra'isi before the election.

Early life and education
Jalili was born in September 1965 in Mashhad in northeastern Iran. He holds a PhD in political science from Imam Sadeq University and his doctoral thesis is entitled "The Foreign Policy of the Prophet Muhammad." After graduating, he served in the Iran–Iraq War as a member of the Basij volunteers of the Army of the Guardians of the Islamic Revolution. During the fighting he was injured severely, losing the lower portion of his right leg in 1986. Upon this event, he earned the title of "living martyr". He has taught political science since 2000 in different intervals at Imam Sadeq University.

Career
Following the war, Jalili began working as a university lecturer at his alma mater. In 1989 Jalili began working at the ministry of foreign affairs in addition to his teaching post. From 1995 to 1996 he served as director of the inspection office at the ministry. In 2001, he was appointed senior director of policy planning in the office of the supreme leader, Ayatollah Ali Khamenei. Jalili was also made a member of the Supreme National Security Council in 2002. Following the election of Mahmoud Ahmadinejad to the presidency in August 2005, Jalili was appointed deputy foreign minister for European and American affairs. He was in office until October 2007. During the same period, he also served as an advisor to Ahmedinejad.

On 20 October 2007, Jalili replaced Ali Larijani as secretary of the council and became responsible for international negotiations over Iran's nuclear program. Jalili's term as secretary of the council ended on 10 September 2013 when Ali Shamkhani was appointed to the post. Immediately after leaving the office, he was appointed by the Supreme Leader Ali Khamenei to the Expediency Council as a member.

Views and activities
Jalili is a leading figure of the "neo-principalist" group in the Iranian political scene and a protégé of Mojtaba Khamenei. A United States State Department cable released by WikiLeaks in 2008 described how a European Union official who met Jalili call him 'a true product of the Iranian revolution'." Mohammad Marandi, a professor at Tehran University, described Jalili as a tough negotiator who "believes strongly in Iran's nuclear program and its sovereign rights. He's not the sort of person to give major concessions."

In an interview with The Boston Globe in 2006, Jalili defended Iran's plans to develop nuclear energy, noting that, under the Shah and before the Islamic Revolution, US companies had contracts to build nuclear power plants in Iran.

2013 presidential candidacy

Jalili was a candidate in the 2013 presidential elections, announcing his candidacy on 22 March 2013. He was supported by Front of Islamic Revolution Stability and also by Kamran Bagheri Lankarani, the party's main candidate who declined his candidacy in favor of Jalili. His campaign Slogan was "A Pleasant Life". He received 4,168,946 and was ranked third, behind president-elect Hassan Rouhani and runner up Mohammad Bagher Ghalibaf.

Shadow Cabinet 
Saeed Jalili in 2013, after the defeat in the elections, proposed the plan of the Shadow Cabinet to help the Hassan Rouhani government and compensate for its shortcomings. He has held several meetings to criticize the government and offer a solution. In early 2021, he met 19 members of parliament and explained a plan to reform the Budget structure. Also, without they took the Petrochemical refinery development plan to the Larijani parliament (right-wing political opposition) and approved it, and the plan was communicated to the Rouhani government (left-wing political opposition) for implementation. Jalili explained the Shadow Cabinet is neither a party nor an organization, but a Discourse and it means that everyone must follow the process of developments, shadow by shadow to have a positive impact on the path of the Islamic Revolution.

2021 presidential candidacy 

Before the last day of registration for the presidential election, he was considered one of the most likely candidates. Although Jalili had said he would not register if Ebrahim Raisi entered the election, with the flood of members and supporters of the established government such as Jahangiri, Larijani, Shariatmadari, Akhundi and Hemmati, it is conflict that he registered in the election individually or to support Raisi.

Personal life
Jalili is fluent in English and Persian. He married Fatemeh Sajjadi, a doctor of internal medicine, in 1992. They have one child, a son named Hamid. Jalili was a resident of Karaj until 2004. He is known for his simple living and aversion towards formality. He drives his own car to work.

Books
 Foreign Policy of the Prophet of Islam
 The Paradigm of Islamic Political Thought in Quran

Influence
In 2009, Jalili was regarded as one of the 500 most influential Muslims by Georgetown University's Center for Muslim-Christian Understanding.

Quotes
Conservatism is murder of [Islamic] revolution.

References

External links

 2021 presidential campaign website
 Interview with The Boston Globe
 FACTBOX: Iran's new atomic negotiator Saeed Jalili from Reuters
 Iranian Presidential Candidate Saeed Jalili Calls for Enrichment to 100 Percent from the Jerusalem Center for Public Affairs

1965 births
Living people
Imam Sadiq University alumni
Iranian Vice Ministers
People from Mashhad
Iranian nuclear negotiators
Front of Islamic Revolution Stability politicians
Candidates for President of Iran
Academic staff of Imam Sadiq University
Representatives of the Supreme Leader
Volunteer Basij personnel of the Iran–Iraq War
Iranian amputees
Iranian politicians with disabilities